Portsmouth F.C. won their first major trophy since 1950, thanks to an FA Cup campaign that saw them beat Cardiff City in the final. The run to the final included a surprise 1–0 victory against Manchester United at Old Trafford, thanks to a Sulley Muntari penalty.

The millions of pounds invested in the squad on players such as Glen Johnson, Lassana Diarra, Muntari and others also enabled Portsmouth to have an unprecedented run in the modern Premier League era, finishing in eighth despite losing the last few matches of the season. During the autumn, Portsmouth was involved in the battle for a Champions League spot, thanks to its surprise form. The season also saw a remarkable game, beating Reading by 7–4 at Fratton Park, following eight goals in the second half.

However, despite the success in the FA Cup and league, the club's overspending on players would lead to a financial crisis that would see Portsmouth enter administration twice and suffer relegation to the fourth tier within five seasons.

Players

First-team squad
Squad at end of season

Left club during season

Reserve squad
The following players did not appear for the first-team this season.

Competitions

Premier League

Results

Table

FA Cup

League Cup

Statistics

Appearances and goals

|-
! colspan=14 style=background:#dcdcdc; text-align:center| Goalkeepers

|-
! colspan=14 style=background:#dcdcdc; text-align:center| Defenders

|-
! colspan=14 style=background:#dcdcdc; text-align:center| Midfielders

|-
! colspan=14 style=background:#dcdcdc; text-align:center| Forwards

|-
! colspan=14 style=background:#dcdcdc; text-align:center| Players transferred out during the season

|-

Top scorers

Premier League
  Benjani – 12
  Jermain Defoe – 7
  Sulley Muntari – 4
  Niko Kranjčar – 3
  Nwankwo Kanu – 3
  John Utaka – 3

Notes

References

External links
2007–08 Portsmouth F.C. season at ESPN

Portsmouth F.C. seasons
Ports